Robert Lacey is a British historian.

Robert Lacey may also refer to:

Bert Lacey (Robert Herbert Lacey, 1900–1984), Australian politician
Bob Lacey (born 1953), baseball pitcher
Bob Lacey of The Bob and Sheri Show
Rob Lacey (1962–2006), British actor and author

See also

Robert De Lacey (1892–1976), American film director

Robert Lacy (disambiguation)